Carleigh Williams (born December 4, 1992) is an American soccer player. She recently played for the Houston Dash, which signed her in January 2015 and waived her in July 2015.

References

External links 
 
 Houston Dash player profile
 UCF player profile

1992 births
Living people
American women's soccer players
Houston Dash players
National Women's Soccer League players
Women's association football defenders
UCF Knights women's soccer players
Houston Dash draft picks
Expatriate women's footballers in Norway
Expatriate women's footballers in France
FC Metz (women) players
Division 1 Féminine players
American expatriate women's soccer players
American expatriate sportspeople in Norway
American expatriate sportspeople in France
Amazon Grimstad players
Toppserien players